The Rhode Island Rams are the athletic programs of the University of Rhode Island, based in Kingston, Rhode Island, United States. The Rams compete in the NCAA's Division I as a member of the Atlantic 10 Conference. The football team, however, competes in the Colonial Athletic Association of the NCAA's Football Championship Subdivision, as the A-10 does not sponsor football. The program's athletic director is Thorr Bjorn.

The school's colors are light blue (officially referred to as "Keaney blue"), white, and navy blue. The school's mascot is Rhody the Ram.  It was chosen in 1923 as tribute to the school's agricultural history, making its first appearance in 1929. The school has not used a live ram since the introduction of "Rhody," a student in an anthropomorphic ram costume, in 1974.

Teams

As a primary member of the Atlantic 10 Conference, the University of Rhode Island sponsors teams in eight men's and ten women's NCAA sanctioned sports, with football competing in the Colonial Athletic Association.

Baseball

The Rams baseball program played its first season in 1898.  It plays at Bill Beck Field on campus.  In 2005, under head coach Frank Leoni, the program reached its first NCAA tournament.

Basketball

URI Basketball went to the NCAA tournament in 2017 after an 18 year drought, nearly upsetting Final Four participant #3 Oregon in the second round. In the 1990s, the Rams made the Big Dance in 1997, 1998, and 1999. In 1998, the Rams went on a surprise run to the Elite 8.

The women's team has made one NCAA appearance in 1996 after going 21–8 and 13–3 in A10 play, losing 90–82 to Oklahoma State. They have one other postseason appearance in the 2022 WNIT.

Football

Softball
Rhode Island's softball team has appeared in one Women's College World Series in 1982.

National championships

Team

Facilities
Source:

Media coverage

Television
University of Rhode Island sports are televised regionally on the Ocean State Network, a joint venture of Cox Communications and WJAR. OSN provides television and streaming coverage of all regular season men's basketball games not broadcast on a national carrier, and select football, baseball, soccer and women's basketball games. Select men's basketball games are also covered by ESPN, and A-10 tournament games are televised by contract with ESPN, CBS and NBC. The University's ACHA men's ice hockey and women's basketball home games have live streaming video available on their respective websites.

Radio
Commercial coverage of men's basketball and football is provided by iHeartMedia stations WHJJ and WWBB in the Providence area, with rights managed by Learfield IMG College. The longtime announcer for both sports is Steve McDonald, who in 2011 was awarded the inaugural Ben Mondor Award for "extraordinary contributions in...sports in Rhode Island".

Non-commercial coverage of home games for football, baseball, men's (and select women's) basketball, as well as the school's ACHA men's ice hockey team can be heard on the University's student radio station WRIU. Other sports, including men's and women's soccer, softball, women's ice hockey and select women's basketball games are carried on WRIU's online station RIU2.

Club sports
The University of Rhode Island Club Sports program consists of 13 teams. Each team is organized and managed by students with guidance from the Coordinator of Club Sports. They include Soccer, Tennis, Hockey, Field Hockey, Rowing, Sailing, Rugby, Swimming, Volleyball, Gymnastics, and Equestrian.  The women's ice hockey team competes in Division I of the American Collegiate Hockey Association in ESCHL league.

Mascot

Rhody the Ram is the official mascot of the University of Rhode Island. His mascot status was given on March 8, 1923, and he made his first appearance on November 21, 1929. At one time a real ram was housed at a dairy barn across from the campus, but that stopped in the 1960s, and was picked up for one year in 1974. Unlike other popular universities, the Rhody the Ram mascot program is run by the URI Student Alumni Association, a student run organization that serves the university by organizing many popular events on campus.

Controversial incidents 

February 3, 1998 – Rhody the Ram tried to prevent the St. Joe's Hawk from his eternal flapping by putting an inner tube over its head, temporarily immobilizing his arms.  While trying to remove the tube, the Hawk's head (costume) fell off. The incident was televised and repeated on ESPN.

References

External links